The Jersey Alliance is a centre-right party in Jersey, formed in 2021 by States Assembly deputy Gregory Guida to compete in the 2022 general election.

From the party's founding in 2021 until the 2022 Jersey election, Jersey Alliance led the Government of Jersey with party member John Le Fondré serving as Chief Minister. In 2022, Mark Boleat was appointed as the leader of the party and nominated to be the next Chief Minister. As a result of the 2022 general election, the Jersey Alliance party lost a majority of its 9 seats that it had previously held in the States Assembly and was reduced to a single seat held by an uncontested Connétable in the parish of Trinity. Party leader Mark Boleat stood in the district of St Clement and was defeated on election day. Boleat received the least amount of votes of any candidate with 721 votes. John Le Fondré also was defeated on election day, becoming the first Jersey Chief Minister to lose his seat in an election.

Less than a month after the General Election, the Party's sole elected member - Constable Philip Le Sueuer - announced that he had resigned from the Party.

Electoral performance 

 Note

References

External links 
 

Political parties in Jersey
Political parties established in 2021